The American Farm Bureau Federation (AFBF), more informally called the American Farm Bureau (AFB) or simply the Farm Bureau, is a United States-based trade association, lobbying group, and insurance network. Headquartered in Washington, D.C., the Farm Bureau has affiliates in all 50 states and Puerto Rico. Each affiliate is a (state or county) Farm Bureau, and the parent organization is also often called simply the Farm Bureau. 

Founded in 1911, the Farm Bureau movement birthed a national lobbying organization in 1920. For decades, it has been among the agriculture industry's largest lobby groups; in 2021, the AFBF spent $2,530,000 on lobbying. In general, it has tried to shape legislation to the benefit of larger farms more than smaller ones. It also lobbies for policies that benefit its for-profit activities, such as federal subsidies for the crop insurance sold by its affiliate companies. Until 2019, it denied that climate change was real.

AFBF itself does not sell insurance, but all but a handful of its non-profit state affiliates have affiliated for-profit insurance companies. Most of AFBF's revenue comes from dues paid by its nearly 5.9 million members, most of whom are not farmers but insurance customers who pay the dues as a condition of their policies.

History 

The Farm Bureau movement started in 1911 when John Barron, a farmer who graduated from Cornell University, worked as an extension agent in Broome County, New York. He served as a Farm Bureau representative for farmers with the Chamber of Commerce of Binghamton, New York. The effort was financed by the U.S. Department of Agriculture and the Lackawanna Railroad. The Broome County Farm Bureau was soon separated from the Chamber of Commerce. Other farm bureaus later formed in counties across the U.S., as listed with dates at "List of Farm Bureaus".

In 1914, with the passage of the Smith–Lever Act of 1914, Congress agreed to share with the states the cost of programs for providing "county agents", who supplied information to farmers on improved methods of animal husbandry and crop production developed by agricultural colleges and experiment stations, which has evolved into the modern-day Cooperative Extension Service.

In 1915, farmers meeting in Saline County, Missouri, formed the first statewide Farm Bureau.

In 1919, a group of farmers from 30 states gathered in Chicago. They founded the American Farm Bureau Federation with the goal of "speaking for themselves through their own national organization". But they also sought to forestall populist organization of small farmers. "The inception of this national farm bureau association is taking place at a most opportune time," Harvey J. Sconce, president of the Illinois Agricultural Association, said at the meeting. "The United States is at present experiencing the greatest period of industrial unrest in its entire history. It is now just one year since the signing of the armistice. During this interval more than 3,000 strikes have been inaugurated in this country. Is it any wonder that production has dwindled and cost of living has so greatly increased? It is our duty in creating this organization to avoid any policy that will align organized farmers with the radicals of other organizations. The policy should be thoroughly American in every respect – a constructive organization instead of a destructive organization." Wrote Brian Campbell, now a professor at Berry College: "Farm Bureau began as a counter-move to various farm organizations that represented small farmers."

The initial organization papers said:

The initial local and state farm bureaus (1910s-1940s) had a social and educational function furthering the extension service efforts, and they also pursued the functions of pooled negotiating power for purchasing of supplies such as seed and equipment (comparable in that respect to farm co-operatives, but with potential for larger/wider unification) and pooled capability to provide fire insurance and vehicle insurance for their farms, via both negotiating power (in group purchasing of insurance) and self-insuring capability (in forming new insurance companies of their own); they were comparable in that respect to mutual insurance companies (and indeed founded various such companies). In all of these functions, local and state farm bureaus thus became an analogue of a farmers' union or a trade association for farmers in the United States; the National Farmers Union was the other such effort, outside of small co-ops. More precisely, the local and state farm bureaus formed a network of such unions or associations with a national parent organization. They were thus somewhat analogous in that respect to a federation of trade unions (such as the AFL–CIO), but with individual family farms being self-employed, the parallel with trade associations is the more relevant analogy.

In the 1930s, the American Farm Bureau Federation developed a lobbying presence in Washington, D.C., where it pushed for changes in New Deal programs to favor large farms with many employees over family farms. Meanwhile, the Minnesota Farmer–Labor Party (FLP), a political party which represented small operators and favored radical programs, was left without power by the New Deal policies, and so in the 1940s the FLP and similar groups in the upper Midwest died or were merged into the Democratic or Republican parties. 

Along with the U.S. Department of Agriculture, the Farm Bureau and other "advocates of a mechanized, highly commercialized agriculture helped initiate an abrupt two-decade shift to machines and wage labor." By World War II, the organization was "the most influential representative of large farmers."

The Farm Bureau dubs itself a "grassroots" organization, but outside observers have long documented how AFBF policy decisions are transmitted to county and state Farm Bureau members for ratification. "This organization is largely controlled from the top. Its leadership is self-perpetuating, and its policy, although nursed through an elaborate procedural labyrinth, is rarely permitted to wander very far afield. 'The Farm Bureau's cherished belief that its policy was made at the grass roots and adopted by democratic process turned out to be partly illusion,' concluded Christiana McFayden Cambell in her study of the organization's New Deal period. There appears to be no reason to change that assessment today," Samuel R. Berger wrote in Dollar Harvest (2nd ed., 1978).

By the 21st century, the AFBF, through its state and local affiliates, was entwined financially with large agribusiness corporations. "In recent years, its insurance affiliates have bought stock in companies like Cargill, ConAgra, Dow Chemical, DuPont, Tyson and Archer Daniels Midland, all major food industry players. The Southern Farm Bureau Annuity Insurance Co. [co-owned by 10 state Farm Bureaus]  once owned more than 18,000 shares of Premium Standard stock," The Nation wrote in 2012.

Bob Stallman, a Texan, served as AFBF president from 2001 to 2016, earning a salary of $832,216 in his final year. Duval took over in January 2017, earning a salary of $648,111 in his first year.

Lobbying 
A 2012 investigation by The Nation detailed the large-scale federal and state political operations of the Farm Bureau:

The Farm Bureau retains 22 registered lobbyists. In 2012, it was the top contributor to federal candidates, parties, and outside groups with payments over $1 million, with 62% to Republicans. From 2002 to 2012, the Farm Bureau spent $16 million, which was 45% of the total amount spent by the 10 largest agribusiness interests in the U.S.

The Farm Bureau supported the Fighting Hunger Incentive Act of 2014 (H.R. 4719; 113th Congress), a bill that would amend the federal tax laws to permanently extend and expand certain expired provisions that provided a bigger tax deduction for businesses that donated food to charitable organizations. The Farm Bureau argued that without the tax write-off, "it is cheaper in most cases for these types of businesses to throw their food away than it is to donate the food".

Climate change
The Farm Bureau has long opposed regulation or taxation of greenhouse gases and climate policy, justifying its actions by denying the scientific consensus on climate change. "For decades, the Farm Bureau has derailed climate action, deploying its political apparatus and 6 million members in a forceful alliance with conservative groups and the fossil fuel industry," Inside Climate News wrote in 2018.

The Farm Bureau's opposition to climate change-related regulation began with cap-and-trade regulation measures, which the Farm Bureau argued would increase fuel and fertilizer prices for farmers. 

In 2003, Farm Bureau economists joined the Heartland and Hudson Institutes in publishing a paper that "called state or federal regulation of greenhouse gases 'unnecessary, enormously expensive, and particularly injurious to the agricultural community.

In 2010, the Farm Bureau's official position was that "there is no generally agreed upon scientific assessment of the exact impact or extent of carbon emissions from human activities, their impact on past decades of warming or how they will affect future climate changes". The climate change session at the Farm Bureau's national meeting that year was entitled "Global Warming: A Red Hot Lie?" It featured Christopher C. Horner, a climate change denier and lawyer for the libertarian Competitive Enterprise Institute, a largely industry-backed group that strongly opposes limits on greenhouse gases. At the meeting, delegates unanimously approved a resolution that "strongly supports any legislative action that would suspend EPA's authority to regulate greenhouse gases under the Clean Air Act". Right before the meeting, the Union of Concerned Scientists sent the group a letter pointing out that its climate change position runs counter to that of every major scientific organization and urged it to support action on climate change. U.S. Secretary of Agriculture Tom Vilsack said that farmers have more to gain from cap and trade than they stand to lose. 

By 2019, the Farm Bureau had ceased to publicly deny climate change, but remained opposed to non-market-based solutions. Politico called it a “longtime, powerful foe of federal action on climate." It continues to argue that carbon and emission restrictions will raise the costs of energy and fertilizer and hamper the competitiveness of American farmers. It opposes taxes on carbon uses or emissions, any law or regulation requiring the reporting of any greenhouse gas emissions by an agricultural entity, any regulation of such emissions by the EPA, and any attempt to regulate methane emissions from livestock. 

In 2020, the Farm Bureau became one of four co-founders of The Food and Agriculture Climate Alliance, a coalition of groups pushing for measures to reduce greenhouse emissions. The coalition's website says its member organizations represent "farmers, ranchers, forest owners, agribusinesses, manufacturers, the food and innovation sector, state governments, sportsmen, and environmental advocates" and cooperate to "develop and promote shared climate policy priorities across the entire agriculture, food and forestry value chains. But The New Republic reported in 2022 that the organization "wants guarantees that farmers will get paid for soil sequestration without anything else in agricultural business-as-usual changing."

Medicaid
In Missouri, the Missouri Farm Bureau came out publicly against Missouri 2020 Constitutional Amendment 2. This amendment expands Medicaid eligibility to individuals age 19 to 64 with incomes below 133-138% of the poverty level starting in July 2021. (Individuals older and younger than this from low-income households were, in some cases, already eligible for Missouri Medicaid.) Under the Affordable Care Act, the federal government pays for 90% of the cost of this expansion in eligibility, leaving Missouri to pay for the remaining 10%. Although organizations like the Brown School of Social Work at Washington University in St. Louis projected that the measure would ultimately reduce costs to the state budget based on the results in other states, possibly by over a billion dollars, the Farm Bureau emphasized the estimated $2 billion cost by 2026, of which the state would pay $200 million, saying Missouri "can’t afford to take on this costly Obamacare program." While acknowledging issues with access to healthcare in rural areas (in a state where 12.3% of the rural population are uninsured, compared with 10.1% in urban areas), the Farm Bureau said that access to healthcare should be addressed without "massively expanding government."

Amendment 2 to expand Medicaid in Missouri passed with 53% of the vote on August 4, 2020, one day after the Missouri Farm Bureau advised voters to "vote no on Amendment 2". Afterward, the Missouri Farm Bureau issued a statement on August 7, 2020, calling for "a serious conversation about initiative petition reform", saying that the amendment process "encourages irresponsible spending". Missouri's initiative petition process is governed by sections 50 and 51 of Article III of the Missouri Constitution, and by various statutes within Title IX, Chapter 116 of the Missouri Revised Statutes. Section 51 states that amendments are passed by majority vote and that an initiative "shall not be used for the appropriation of money other than of new revenues created and provided for thereby", while the Farm Bureau argued that "the easy access to the ballot and the requirement that constitutional amendments only need a simple majority to change the state constitution are the equivalent of handing an unlimited line of credit to a majority of the state’s voters." The Farm Bureau described the difficulties for the state's budget amid the Covid-19 pandemic and then stated, "those who want to change the state, for better or worse, will be busy lining up founders and consultants for the next assault on our constitution."

Animal welfare 

In 2022, the Farm Bureau joined the National Pork Producers Council in petitioning the Supreme Court of the United States to overturn California's Prevention of Cruelty to Farm Animals Act in National Pork Producers Council v. Ross.

Insurance
In addition to its political lobbying, the Farm Bureau is "a multi-billion dollar network of for-profit insurance companies" and the third-largest insurance group in the United States, The Nation wrote in 2012. Although AFBF itself does not sell insurance, all but a handful of its non-profit state affiliates have affiliated for-profit insurance companies. Most of these companies were founded by the state Farm Bureaus and retain "Farm Bureau" in their corporate names; some use the NFBF logo. "In many states, Missouri among them, members of the Farm Bureau board and the board of its affiliated insurance company are one and the same, sharing office buildings and support staff," The Nation wrote. 

In many states, the non-profit state Farm Bureau owns the affiliated for-profit insurance company. FBL Financial Group, for example, was established in 1939 as Farm Bureau Mutual Insurance Company by the Iowa chapter of the Farm Bureau. Through expansion and mergers, FBL has grown to operate in 14 states, generally selling to consumers under the name Farm Bureau Financial Services. In 2022, it had profits of $72.51 million on revenues of $732.3 million. Its parent, the Iowa Farm Bureau, reported 2020 revenue of about $100 million and an investment portfolio worth more than $1 billion, while executive compensation was in the high six figures." 

Similarly, Nationwide Mutual Insurance Company began as an insurance company for members of the Ohio Farm Bureau Federation and today serves as an insurance provider to Farm Bureaus in nine states. Farm Family Insurance, founded in 1955 by Farm Bureaus of several northeastern states, had 2000 revenues of $313 million and assets of more than $1.3 billion. Country Financial, founded by the Illinois Farm Bureau in 1925, served clients in 17 states as of 2017. 

"The Farm Bureau has many for-profit interests outside of traditional farming," 60 Minutes''' Mike Wallace reported in 2000. "Its Iowa chapter alone owns and operates a $3.5 billion insurance and financial services company that is traded on the New York Stock Exchange. That company, FBL Financial Group, gave thousands of stock options to its directors, including the presidents of 14 state Farm Bureaus." Ed Wiederstein, president of the Iowa Farm Bureau and chairman of FBL Financial, cashed in a "couple of hundred thousand bucks from stock options" in 1998.

Similarly, AFBF president Zippy Duval simultaneously serves as president and chairman of the board of American Agricultural Insurance Company, whose directors are the presidents of 16 of the state Farm Bureaus. (AAIC's bylaws require its board to consist of the AFBF president and representatives of state Farm Bureaus that own sufficient stock in the company.) Founded by the AFBF in 1948 as a reinsurance company, AAIC began selling crop insurance in 1997. Its common stock is held by AFBF (443 shares in 2018) and various state Farm Bureau insurance companies (a total of 265,830 shares in 2018); it is unclear who owns its premium stock, which has a par value ten times that of the common stock. In 2021, AAIC reported total assets of $1.8 billion (up from $1.35 billion in 2018), premiums of $464 million (up from $328 million in 2018), and cash on hand of $120 million. 

These kinds of ties can create conflicts of interest. "Nonprofit executives are supposed to operate in the best interest of the nonprofit, not themselves. But, by not taking salaries and having their income tied to FBL’s performance, the [Iowa] Farm Bureau’s executives open themselves up to questions," wrote Investigate Midwest, an independent, nonprofit newsroom. 

The AFBF and its affiliated insurance companies are entwined in other ways as well. Most of the people it claims as "members" are not farmers but insurance customers: "In many states, anyone who signs up for Farm Bureau insurance becomes a member of the Farm Bureau automatically, which explains why the American Farm Bureau Federation boasts 6 million members when the United States has only about 2 million farmers." Sometimes annual-dues-paying membership in a state Farm Bureau is required to purchase the insurance; sometimes the insurance companies pay the state or county Farm Bureau a fee per member to access their contact information for marketing purposes. In 2019, AFBF collected $28.4 million in member dues, which accounted for more than three-quarters of its total revenue of $37.6 million. 

The AFBF frequently lobbies for policies that will increase profits for its insurance companies. Farm Bureau-affiliated companies collected $300 million in crop insurance premiums in 2011. The AFBF was heavily involved in lobbying for the 2012 farm bill, which included $9 billion in federal subsidies for crop insurance.

The Farm Bureau also owns crop insurer American Farm Bureau Insurance Services.

List of state Farm Bureaus

 References 

Further reading
 
 Berger, Samuel R.: Dollar Harvest: An Exposé of the Farm Bureau. (AAM Publications, 1978)
 Berlage, Nancy K. "Organizing the farm bureau: Family, community, and professionals, 1914-1928." Agricultural history 75.4 (2001): 406-437. online

Campbell, B.C. (2005) "Developing Dependence, Encountering Resistance: The Historical Ethnoecology of Farming in the Missouri Ozarks." Ph.D. dissertation, University of Georgia, Athens.60 Minutes (April 6, 2000): "The Farm Bureau's Big Business"
 Defenders of Wildlife: "Amber Waves of Gain" (April 2000)
 Food and Water Watch: "The Farm Bureau’s Billions: The Voice of Farmers or Agribusiness?" (July 2010)
 Hansen, John Mark. Gaining access: Congress and the farm lobby, 1919-1981 (U of Chicago Press, 1991). online
 McConnell, Grant. The Decline of Agrarian Democracy (U of California Press, 1953), DOI: https://doi.org/10.1525/9780520349285-007 online
 Porter, Kimberly K. "Embracing the pluralist perspective: the Iowa farm Bureau federation and the McNary-haugen movement." Agricultural history'' 74.2 (2000): 381-392. online

External links

Links to the AFBF's IRS Form 990 tax filings: 2005-2020
Guide to the North Carolina Farm Bureau Records 1936-2012

 
Financial services companies established in 1911
Agricultural organizations based in the United States
United States Department of Agriculture
Delaware, Lackawanna and Western Railroad
Saline County, Missouri
Non-profit organizations based in Washington, D.C.
Economy of Des Moines, Iowa
Organizations of environmentalism skeptics and critics
1911 establishments in Washington, D.C.
Lobbying organizations based in Washington, D.C.
Climate change denial
Lobbying organizations in the United States